Hamed Shami Zaher (born 13 November 1984) is a Qatari footballer of Sudanese origin who is a defender for Al Gharrafa. He is a member of the Qatar national football team.

Career
Shami played with Al Gharafa from the age of 9, eventually breaking into the first team in 1999. In 2011, he personally received a formal offer to play for Saudi's Al Nassr FC from the chairman, Prince Faisal Bin Turki Bin Nasser.

In a very dramatic Gulf Cup of Nations in 2010, Shami featured in a match against Saudi Arabia; the last hope of Qatar  qualifying for the knockout stage. Qatar required 3 points in order to edge out Saudi Arabia and claim the runners-up spot in their group. Ibrahim Al-Ghanim scored a goal late in the second half, however, his efforts were undone as Shami scored an own goal in the 89th minute (the only own goal of the tournament), leaving Saudi Arabia a point clear of Qatar. As a result, he was excluded from the national team.

References

External links 
 
 
 Hamed Shami at Goalzz.com

1984 births
Qatari footballers
Living people
Al-Gharafa SC players
Qatar Stars League players
Qatari people of Sudanese descent
Sudanese emigrants to Qatar
Naturalised citizens of Qatar
Association football defenders
Qatar international footballers